Advances in Atmospheric Sciences is a bimonthly peer-reviewed scientific journal co-published by Springer Science+Business Media and Science Press. It covers research on the dynamics, physics and chemistry of the atmosphere and oceans, including weather systems, numerical weather prediction, climate dynamics and variability, and satellite meteorology. It was established in 1984. The editors-in-chief are Mu Mu, Junji Cao, and Ming Xue. According to the Journal Citation Reports, the journal has a 2020 impact factor of 3.158.

References

External links 
 

Publications established in 1984
English-language journals
Springer Science+Business Media academic journals
Bimonthly journals
Earth and atmospheric sciences journals